Force of Impulse is a 1961 American drama film directed by Saul Swimmer and starring Robert Alda, Jeff Donnell and J. Carrol Naish. A high school student robs his own father's grocery store in order to raise the money to take his girlfriend out.

Plot

Cast
 Robert Alda as Warren Reese 
 J. Carrol Naish as Antonio Marino 
 Tony Anthony as Toby Marino 
 Jeff Donnell as Louise Reese 
 Jody McCrea as Phil Anderson 
 Brud Talbot as George
 Lionel Hampton as Himself 
 Christina Crawford as Ann 
 Kathy Barr as Kathy 
 Teri Hope as Bunny Reese 
 Paul Daniel as Uncle Luigi

Novelization
Slightly in advance of the film's release, as was the custom of the era, a paperback novelization of the film was published by Popular Library. The author was renowned crime and western novelist Marvin H. Albert, who also made something of a cottage industry out of movie tie-ins. He seems to have been the most prolific screenplay novelizer of the late '50s through mid '60s, and, during that time, the preeminent specialist at light comedy.

References

Bibliography
 McCarty, Clifford. Film Composers in America: A Filmography, 1911-1970. Oxford University Press, 2000.

External links

1961 films
American drama films
1961 drama films
Astor Pictures films
Films directed by Saul Swimmer
1960s English-language films
1960s American films